Charles Dunn or Charlie Dunn may refer to:

Charles Dunn (Wisconsin politician) (1799–1872), American politician
Charles J. Dunn (1872–1939), American jurist and politician
Charles Morton Dunn (1892–1975), Canadian politician
Charlie Dunn (c. 1898–1993), American bootmaker
Charles Dunn (Japanologist) (1915–1995), British Japanologist

See also
Charles Dunne (born 1993), English footballer